Tan Qiwei (born August 1954) is a former Chinese politician of Tujia ethnic heritage. He was the Vice Mayor of Chongqing, then the Vice Chairman of the Chongqing People's Congress. He was dismissed from office in May 2014 and placed under investigation by the Communist Party's anti-corruption body.

Early life and education
Tan was born and raised in Shizhu County, Chongqing, where he graduated from Chongqing Party School of the Chinese Communist Party.

Career
Tan joined the workforce in March 1973 and joined the Chinese Communist Party in November 1973.

During the Cultural Revolution, Tan worked as a sent-down youth in his hometown.

In July 1985, he was appointed the CPC County Committee Vice-Secretary and County Governor of Shizhu Tujia Autonomous County, he remained in that position until September 1989, when he was transferred to Youyang Tujia and Miao Autonomous County and appointed the CPC County Committee Secretary.

From November 1991 to March 1997, Tan worked in Qianjiang District of Chongqing as an officer. Then he was transferred to Nan'an District as the District Mayor and CPC Vice-Secretary, he became the CPC Party Secretary in December 2001, and served until March 2006.

In March 2006 he was promoted to become the Vice Mayor of Chongqing, a position he held until January 2013, he took charge of the project Three Gorges Dam. In January 2013, Tan was appointed as the Vice-Chairman of Chongqing People's Congress.

Investigation
On May 3, 2014, Tan was being investigated by the Central Commission for Discipline Inspection for "serious violations of laws and regulations". Tan was removed from office in September 2014, and expelled from the Chinese Communist Party.

On January 7, 2016, Tan was sentenced to 12-year jail and confiscate personal property worth 1 million yuan (~$154,000) for taking bribes worth 11 million yuan by the court.

References

1954 births
Living people
Chinese Communist Party politicians from Chongqing
Expelled members of the Chinese Communist Party
People's Republic of China politicians from Chongqing
Chinese politicians convicted of corruption
Delegates to the 11th National People's Congress from Chongqing
Tujia people